The 2005–06 Argentine First Division Apertura was a nail biter. After a head-to-head finish in the last weeks Boca Juniors took the trophy home. Gimnasia de La Plata will have to wait for their first-ever championship. The 2005–06 Argentine First Division Clausura saw Boca Juniors become the first team since River Plate in 1999–2000 to win the Apertura and the Clausura in the same season. This capped an amazing year for Boca, as they won every tournament they were eligible (they were not eligible for the Copa Libertadores after a dismal Clausura last season). Lanús were the big surprise of the Clausura, as they finished second in the league. Boca also achieved 80 points in a season for the first time since 1998/99 when they scored 89 points.

Argentina drew one of the most difficult groups in the 2006 FIFA World Cup, advanced to the second round but lost against hosts Germany in the quarter-finals.

After an abysmal season, Instituto and Tiro Federal were relegated to the Nacional B Division a few weeks before the end of the tournament. The next two worst teams in the relegation standings, Argentinos Juniors and Olimpo de Bahía Blanca, played a Promoción playoff (home and away) series against Huracán and Belgrano de Córdoba, respectively, for two spots in next year's Argentine First Division. Argentinos Juniors remains in the top category after drawing with Huracán twice. Olimpo, however, were relegated to Nacional B after losing twice to Belgrano.

Torneo Apertura ("Opening" Tournament)

Top Scorers

Relegation

There is no relegation after the Apertura. For the relegation results of this tournament see below.

Torneo Clausura ("Closing" Tournament)

Top Scorers

Relegation

"Promoción" playoff

Argentinos Juniors remains in the Argentine First Division after a 3 - 3 aggregate tie by virtue of a "sports advantage". In case of a tie in goals, the team from the First Division gets to stay in it.

Belgrano de Córdoba wins 4-2 and is promoted to Argentine First Division. Olimpo de Bahia Blanca is relegated to the Argentine Nacional B.

Lower leagues

Clubs in international competitions

National team
This section covers Argentina's matches from August 1, 2005 to July 31, 2006.

Friendly matches

2006 World Cup qualifiers

2006 World Cup

External links
 AFA
Argentina on FIFA.com
Argentina 2005–2006 by Juan Pablo Andrés at RSSSF.

 
Seasons in Argentine football
Argentina
Argentina
Football (soccer)
Football (soccer)